Mohammad Shafar (died March 5, 2012) was a leader of the Awakening movement in and around Haditha, Iraq.  

This was a group of Sunni Arab militias who had allied themselves with the American-backed Iraqi government.  Shafar was killed by a rebel gunman on March, 5th, 2012 in an attack on Haditha that left at least 20 people dead.

Sources
Jack Healy. "Gunmen in Uniforms Kill 20 Police Officers in Iraq", New York Times, March 6, 2012, p. A8.

2012 deaths

Year of birth missing